Araboy is a townland in County Antrim, Northern Ireland. It is situated in the historic barony of Cary and the civil parish of Ballintoy and covers an area of 430 acres.

The name derives from the Irish: Aradh Buidhe (yellow land) or Ard Buidhe (yellow height).

The population of the townland decreased during the 19th century:

See also 
List of townlands in County Antrim

References

Townlands of County Antrim
Civil parish of Ballintoy